Valkovsky Uyezd was one of the subdivisions of the Kharkov Governorate of the Russian Empire. It was situated in the western part of the governorate. Its administrative centre was Valky.

Demographics
At the time of the Russian Empire Census of 1897, Valkovsky Uyezd had a population of 144,322. Of these, 97.1% spoke Ukrainian, 2.6% Russian and 0.1% Polish as their native language.

References

 
Uezds of Kharkov Governorate
Kharkov Governorate